Lukinskoye is a rural locality (village) in Lukinskoye Rural Settlement, Chagodoshchensky District, Vologda Oblast, Russia. The population was 41 as of 2002.

Geography 
Krasnaya Gorka is the nearest rural locality.

References 

Rural localities in Chagodoshchensky District